Jim Sullivan  (died 16 September 1992) was a leading member of the Official Irish Republican Army from the lower Falls area of Belfast.

Sullivan was second in command of the Belfast Brigade of the Official IRA (under Billy McMillen) and played an important role in events in Belfast during the late 1960s and early 1970s. He was chairman of the Central Citizens' Defence Committees established in the city after the burning of many homes by loyalist mobs in the 1969 Northern Ireland Riots. He also played an important role in the Falls Curfew, a three-day gun battle in July 1970 between the Official IRA and the British Army.

In later years Sullivan played a leading role in the development of the Republican Clubs, which became the Workers' Party in 1982. In 1973 he was elected to Belfast City Council for that party and retained his seat except for one term after the 1981 election when he lost to the IRSP candidate, until he retired in the late 1980s.

References

1992 deaths
Members of Belfast City Council
Irish republicans
Official Irish Republican Army members
Workers' Party (Ireland) politicians
Year of birth missing